Kong Christian stod ved højen mast ("King Christian stood by the lofty mast"), commonly shortened to Kong Christian, is the unofficial royal anthem of the Kingdom of Denmark that officially has equal status of national anthem together with Der er et yndigt land, though it is almost exclusively used in relation to the Danish royal house and the military. The theme of the song is about the heroics of Danish and Norwegian sailors during the wars against Sweden (including the Torstenson War) in the 17th and 18th centuries.

On New Year's Eve, it is tradition to sing along as the Danmarks Radio Girl's Choir sing the song on television, immediately after midnight following the other national anthem. Usually, only the first verse is sung on official occasions. Adopted in 1780, it is one of the oldest national anthems in the world.

The lyrics

History of the lyrics
The lyrics first appeared in May 1778, in Johannes Ewald's vaudeville play The Fishermen, which premiered at the Royal Danish Theatre in January 1780 on the birthday of King Christian VII. The play depicts the heroics of fishermen from the northern part of Zealand, who saved a lot of sailors from drowning and then refused to take pay for it. For this reason, the play was seen as a tribute to the navy, in particular because of the King Christian song. In the original staging of the play, however, only the final fourth verse was ever sung. The first three verses were omitted because of the animosity they showed towards Sweden, who at the time were an important ally against the United Kingdom as members of the League of Armed Neutrality.

Theme
The theme of the song is the heroics of Danish-Norwegian sailors during the wars against Sweden in the 17th and 18th centuries. It specifically names the Danish-Norwegian naval heroes King Christian IV, Niels Juel and Peter Wessel Tordenskiold. The first verse refers to the 1644 Battle of Colberger Heide, where King Christian IV is hurt by shrapnel and thought to be dead but quickly gets to his feet and incites his crew to continue the battle.

History of the music
It has long been debated who composed the music to the song. It was originally accredited to Johann Hartmann, the same composer who wrote the score for the original play Fiskerne, where the lyrics had first appeared.

Another suggestion was that a friend of Johannes Ewald, High Court judge Ditlev Ludvig Rogert, who was known to have played the violin, had been the original composer – a claim that was backed up by several 19th century intellectuals. In 1880, Vilhelm Carl Ravn presented his theory that the score significantly preceded Ewald's poem and had no one particular composer. This is the most commonly supported theory today.

However, even today the score is also often wrongfully accredited to Friedrich Kuhlau, who made "King Christian" a popular anthem by using his own arrangement of the score in his play Elverhøj, which premiered at the wedding between Crown Prince Frederik (the later King Frederik VII) and Princess Vilhelmine in November 1828.

Lyrics

See also
 Festival Overture on the Danish National Anthem – a musical piece by Tchaikovsky composed for the visit of the tsarevich to the Moscow Conservatoire accompanied by his new Danish wife. The piece is based on Kong Christian stod ved højen mast but also incorporates elements of the Russian national anthem.

References

Notes

Danish anthems
Royal anthems
Cultural depictions of Christian IV of Denmark
Songs about kings
Danish monarchy
National anthem compositions in B-flat major
Historical national anthems